Géza Dósa (1846–1871) was a Hungarian painter. He studied in Vienna and Munich between 1866 - 1869. His art was appreciated only decades after his death. His paintings are exhibited in the Hungarian National Gallery and in the museum of Târgu-Mureş.

Sources
 Képzőművészet Magyarországon: Dósa Géza
 Magyar életrajzi lexikon IV: 1978–1991 (A–Z). Főszerk. Kenyeres Ágnes. Budapest: Akadémiai 1994 
 Hungarian National Gallery: Dósa Géza (1846-1871) élete és mûvészete, Szinyei Merse, Anna, in: A Magyar Nemzeti Galéria évkönyve 1997–2001, Budapest, 2002 (pp. 169–182)

1846 births
1871 deaths
19th-century Hungarian painters
1870s suicides
Hungarian male painters
19th-century Hungarian male artists